Details Sketchy is an EP by Dessau, released on September 19, 1995, by Fifth Colvmn Records. The album was Fifth Colvmn' fastest seller despite composer John Elliott being underwhelmed by the finished recordings.

Music
The EP Details Sketchy revealed the band adopting more of a heavy metal-style in comparison to their dance oriented back catalogue. The track "The Sun" appeared on two various artists compilations, 1995's Forced Cranial Removal by Fifth Colvmn Records and 2009's Resurrection 3 by WTII Records.

Reception
Fabryka Music Magazine gave Details Sketchy two out of four stars and said "there are several rock songs in the cloud of samples ad loops but such a fusion doesn't impress because either of the ideas or the dynamics." Black Monday called the EP "nothing memorable" and noted that its "being "pushed" on the laurels of guest performances by members of Ministry, Revolting Cocks, Nine In Nails, Filter and Die Warzau. Sonic Boom said "the music itself is kind of a light-hearted dance festival with catchy lyrics with the occasional guitar chord thrown in for good measure" and compared it favorably to Filter's or Revolting Cocks' lighter material.

Track listing

Personnel
Adapted from the Details Sketchy liner notes.

Dessau
 John Elliott – programming, keyboards, additional drums, production, recording, engineering, mixing
 Norm Rau – vocals, guitar, percussion

Additional performers
 Luc van Acker – additional guitar
 Paul Barker – additional guitar, additional bass guitar
 Frank Brodlo – additional bass guitar
 Ken Coomer – additional drums
 Van Christie – additional programming, additional synthesizer, production
 Bill Jackson – additional guitar
 Jim Marcus – additional programming
 Jason McNinch – additional programming, additional synthesizer, additional guitar, production, recording, engineering, mixing, editing
 Skot Nelson – additional guitar
 Richard Patrick – additional guitar
 Don Wallace – additional bass guitar
 Matt Warren – additional programming
 Mars Williams – additional saxophone

Production and design
 Robb Earls – recording, engineering, mixing
 Zalman Fishman – executive-producer
 Dylan Thomas More – art direction, design
 Jay O'Rourke – mastering
 Wayne Stearns – photography

Release history

References

External links 
 Details Sketchy at Discogs (list of releases)

1995 EPs
Fifth Colvmn Records EPs
Dessau (band) albums